The Lucainena de las Torres Photovoltaic Power Station is a photovoltaic power station in Lucainena de las Torres, Almería in Spain.  It consists of different units. Lucainena de las Torres 1 has a total capacity of 7.4 MWp and its annual output is about 11.42 GWh. It was commissioned in July 2008.  Lucainena de las Torres 2 has a total capacity of 7.9 MWpand its annual output is about 12.236 GWh.  It was commissioned in July 2008.

See also

Photovoltaic power stations

References

Photovoltaic power stations in Spain
Energy in Andalusia